Striking southern Italy on September 8, the 1905 Calabria earthquake had a moment magnitude of 7.2 and a maximum Mercalli intensity of XI (Extreme). The first major earthquake of the 20th century, it severely damaged parts of Lipari, Messina Province and a large area between Cosenza and Nicotera and killed between 557 and 2,500 people.

Damage
The earthquake affected the Calabria region, destroying as many as 25 villages, and 14,000 homes.

See also
 List of earthquakes in 1905
 List of earthquakes in Italy

References

External links 
M 7.2 - Sicily, Italy – United States Geological Survey

1905 earthquakes
1905 Calabria
1905 in Italy
1905 in science
History of Calabria
1905 tsunamis
September 1905 events
1905 disasters in Italy